Earl de Grey, of Wrest in the County of Bedford, was a title in the Peerage of the United Kingdom.

History
The title was created on 25 October 1816 (as Countess de Grey) for Amabell Hume-Campbell, Dowager Lady Polwarth and suo jure 5th Baroness Lucas, with remainder to the heirs male of her body, and in default of such issue to her sister Mary Jemima Robinson, Dowager Baroness Grantham, and the heirs male of her body. She was the elder daughter and co-heir of Philip Yorke, 2nd Earl of Hardwicke, and Jemima Campbell, 2nd Marchioness Grey (see Marquess Grey), eldest daughter of John Campbell, 3rd Earl of Breadalbane and Holland, and Lady Amabel Grey, eldest daughter of Henry Grey, 1st Duke of Kent (see Duke of Kent).

The marquessate of Grey had become extinct on her mother's death in 1797, and when the Grey title was revived in favour of her daughter, the style "de Grey" was used to distinguish it from the earldom of Grey, which had been created in 1806; the Grey family was extremely distantly related to the Earls Grey. The Countess de Grey was the widow of Alexander Hume-Campbell, Lord Polwarth, eldest son of Hugh Hume, 3rd Earl of Marchmont.

The Countess de Grey was childless, and she was succeeded in the barony of Lucas according to the normal descent of that title and in the earldom of de Grey according to the special remainder by her nephew, Thomas Robinson, 3rd Baron Grantham, who assumed the surname of de Grey on succeeding to the title. Lord de Grey was the eldest son of Thomas Robinson, 2nd Baron Grantham, and the aforementioned Mary Jemima Robinson, Dowager Baroness Grantham (died 1830), sister of the Countess de Grey (see Marquess of Ripon for earlier history of the Robinson family).

He died in 1859 and was succeeded in the barony of Lucas (which could be passed on through female lines) by his eldest daughter Lady Anne (see Baron Lucas for further history of this title) and in the earldom of de Grey (which could only be passed on through male lines) by his nephew, George Robinson, 2nd Earl of Ripon, only son of F. J. Robinson, 1st Earl of Ripon, the former prime minister better known as Lord Goderich. On succeeding to the earldom of de Grey, Lord Ripon styled himself "Earl de Grey and Ripon". In 1871, he was created Marquess of Ripon, whereafter Earl de Grey became the courtesy title used by the heir apparent to the marquessate. Ripon was succeeded by his son and only surviving child, Frederick Robinson, 2nd Marquess of Ripon. The second Marquess was childless, and on his death in 1923, the marquessate and earldom of de Grey and all other titles became extinct.

Earls de Grey (1816)
Amabel Hume-Campbell, 1st Countess de Grey (1751–1833)
Thomas Philip de Grey, 2nd Earl De Grey, 3rd Baron Grantham (1781–1859)
George Frederick Samuel Robinson, 1st Marquess of Ripon, 3rd Earl de Grey (1827–1909)
Frederick Oliver Robinson, 2nd Marquess of Ripon, 4th Earl de Grey (1852–1923)

See also
Duke of Kent (1710 creation)
Marquess Grey
Baron Lucas
Marquess of Ripon

References

Grey
Noble titles created in 1816
Robinson family
Peerages created with special remainders